This article provides the list of the 104 unity schools in Nigeria.

Federal Science and Technical College, Lassa
Federal Government Girls College, Jalingo
Federal Science and Technical College, Michika
Federal Government College, Azare
Federal Government College, Maiduguri
Federal Government Girls College, Monguno
Federal Government College, Billiri
Federal Government College, Buni-Yadi
Federal Government Girls College, Bauchi
Federal Government College, Wukari
Federal Government College, Bajoga
Federal Government Girls College, Yola
Federal Government Girls College, Potiskum
Federal Government College, Ganye
Federal Government College, Jos
Federal Government College, Keffi
Federal Government Girls College, Rubochi
Federal Government Girls College, Garki
Federal Government College, Okigwe
Federal Government Girls College, Umuahia
Federal Government College, Enugu
Federal Government Girls College, Lejja
Federal Government College, Vandeikya
Federal Government College, Ugwolawo
Federal Government Girls College, Kabba
Federal Government Girls College, Omu-Aran
Federal Government College, Ilorin
Federal Government Girls College, Bida
Federal Government Girls College, Langtang
Federal Government Girls College, Abaji
Federal Government Girls College, Gboko
Federal Science and Technical College, Orozo
Federal Science and Technical College, Kuta
Federal Science and Technical College, Otobi
Federal Government College, Minna
Federal Government College, Suleja
Federal Government Girls College, Bwari
Federal Government Girls College, New Bussa
Federal Science and Technical College, Otukpo
Federal Government Girls College, Keana
Federal Science and Technical College, Doma
Federal Science College, Sokoto
Federal Government Girls College, Tambuwal
Federal Government College, Kano
Federal Government College, Daura
Federal Government College, Birnin Yauri
Federal Government College, Kiyawa
Federal Government Girls College, Minjibir
Federal Government Girls College, Bakori
Federal Government Girls College, Gwandu
Federal Government Girls College, Gusau
Federal Government College, Anka
Federal Science and Technical College, Zuru
Federal Government College, Kaduna
Federal Government Girls College, Zaria
Federal Science and Technical College, Kafanchan
Federal Science and Technical College, Dayi
Federal Government College, Odogbolu
Federal Government College, Ogbomoso
Federal Government College, Ikirun
King's College, Lagos
Queen's College, Lagos
Federal Government College, Ijanikineen's
Federal Government College, Sokoto
Federal Government Girls College, Akure
Federal Government College, Idoani
Federal Government Girls College, Ipetumodu
Federal Government Girls College, Oyo
Federal Government Girls College, Efon Alaaye
Federal Science and Technical College, Yaba
Federal Science and Technical College, Ilesa
Federal Government College, Ikole
Federal Science and Technical College, Usi-Ekiti
Federal Science and Technical College, Ikare-Akoko
Federal Government Girls College, Sagamu
Federal Science and Technical College, Ijebu-Imushin
Federal Government College, Ibillo
Federal Government Girls College, Imiringi
Federal Science and Technical College, Tungbo
Federal Science and Technical College, Uyo
Federal Science and Technical College, Uromi
Federal Government College, Ikom
Federal Science College, Ogoja
Federal Government Girls College, Calabar
Federal Government Girls College, Ibusa
Federal Government Girls College, Benin
Federal Government College, Ikot Ekpene
Federal Government Girls' College, Owerri
Federal Government Girls College, Ezzamgbo
Federal Science and Technical College, Awka
Federal Government College, Ohanso
Federal Government Girls' College, Abuloma
Federal Government College, Warri
Federal Government College, Odi
Federal Government College, Ohafia
Federal Government College, Okposi
Federal Government Girls College, Onitsha
Federal Government College, Nise

References

unity schools